George Palmer Dyer (February 7, 1876 – June 22, 1948) was an American football player and coach. He served as the head football coach at the United States Military Academy in 1896, compiling a record of 3–2–1. Dyer played at Cornell University in 1893 and 1894. He later served in the United States Navy as a paymaster. He married Dorothy Sturges Bell on 9 October 1901 aboard the U.S.S. Santee. They were divorced in Nevada in February 1940.  He married Amelia Frances Goodrich Jarvie, born 30 June 1881 in Brooklyn, N.Y., on 21 September 1940 in Essex, Ma.  They lived at Yellow Jacket Ranch in Calistoga, Ca until Amelia's death on 25 July 1945.

Head coaching record

References

1876 births
1948 deaths
19th-century players of American football
Army Black Knights football coaches
Cornell Big Red football players
Sportspeople from Montevideo